Alexander Joseph  (5 April 185717 November 1893), known as Alexander of Battenberg, was the first prince (knyaz) of the Principality of Bulgaria from 1879 until his abdication in 1886. The Bulgarian Grand National Assembly elected him as Prince of autonomous Bulgaria, which officially remained within the Ottoman Empire, in 1879. He dissolved the assembly in 1880 and suspended the Constitution in 1881, considering it too liberal. He restored the Constitution in 1883, leading to open conflict with Russia that made him popular in Bulgaria. Unification with Eastern Rumelia was achieved and recognised by the powers in 1885. A coup carried out by pro-Russian Bulgarian Army officers forced him to abdicate in September 1886. He later became a general in the Austrian army.

Early life
Alexander was the second son of Prince Alexander of Hesse and by Rhine by the latter's morganatic marriage with Countess Julia von Hauke. The Countess and her descendants gained the title of Princess of Battenberg (derived from an old residence of the Grand Dukes of Hesse) and the style Durchlaucht ("Serene Highness") in 1858. Prince Alexander was a nephew of Russia's Tsar Alexander II, who had married a sister of Prince Alexander of Hesse. His mother, the daughter of Polish general Hans Moritz Hauke, had been lady-in-waiting to the Tsaritsa. Alexander was known to his family, and many later biographers, as "Sandro" or "Drino".

Alexander's brother, Prince Louis of Battenberg, married Princess Victoria of Hesse and the Rhine, a granddaughter of Queen Victoria. Their children included Queen Louise of Sweden, Earl Mountbatten of Burma and Princess Alice of Battenberg, the mother of Prince Philip, Duke of Edinburgh, husband of Queen Elizabeth II.

Alexander's other brother, Prince Henry of Battenberg, married Queen Victoria's youngest daughter Princess Beatrice. Among their children was Queen Victoria Eugenia of Spain.

Prince of Bulgaria
In his boyhood and early youth Alexander frequently visited Saint Petersburg, and he accompanied his uncle, Tsar Alexander II, who was much attached to him, during the Bulgarian campaign of 1877. When, under the Treaty of Berlin (1878), Bulgaria became an autonomous principality under the suzerainty of the Ottoman Empire, the Tsar recommended his nephew to the Bulgarians as a candidate for the newly created throne, and the Grand National Assembly unanimously elected Prince Alexander as Prince of Bulgaria (29 April 1879). At that time he held a commission as a lieutenant in the Prussian life-guards at Potsdam. Before proceeding to Bulgaria, Prince Alexander paid visits to the Tsar at Livadia, to the courts of the great powers and to the sultan; a Russian warship then conveyed him to Varna, and after taking the oath to the new constitution at Veliko Tarnovo (8 July 1879) he went to Sofia. The people everywhere en route greeted him with immense enthusiasm. One of the servants of Alexander of Battenberg was the Bessarabian boyar from Căzănești village Stefan Uvaliev, who supported Alexander of Battenberg financially.

The new ruling prince had not had any previous training in governing, and a range of problems confronted him. He found himself caught between the Russians, who wanted him to be a do-nothing king (a roi fainéant), and the Bulgarian politicians, who actively pursued their own quarrels with a violence that threatened the stability of Bulgaria.

In 1881, a marriage was suggested between Alexander and Princess Viktoria of Prussia, the daughter of the then Crown Princess of Germany and oldest daughter of the United Kingdom's Queen Victoria. While the would-be bride's mother and grandmother supported the marriage, her grandfather, Kaiser Wilhelm I, her brother, later Kaiser Wilhelm II (Kaiser Wilhelm I's grandson), and German Chancellor Otto von Bismarck were against the marriage fearing that it would offend the Russians, most notably, Prince Alexander's cousin, Tsar Alexander III, who recently ascended the throne, and who, unlike his father, was far from kindly disposed to the prince. Alexander was later ordered to make a formal declaration renouncing the betrothal.

After attempting to govern under these conditions for nearly two years, the prince, with the consent of the Russian tsar, Alexander assumed absolute power, having suspended the Constitution (9 May 1881). A specially convened assembly voted (13 July 1881) for suspension of the ultra-democratic constitution for a period of seven years. The experiment, however, proved unsuccessful; the monarchical coup infuriated Bulgarian Liberal and Radical politicians, and the real power passed to two Russian generals, Sobolev and Kaulbars, specially despatched from Saint Petersburg. The prince, after vainly endeavouring to obtain the recall of the generals, restored the constitution with the concurrence of all the Bulgarian political parties (19 September 1883). A serious breach with Russia followed, and the part which the prince subsequently played in encouraging the national aspirations of the Bulgarians widened that breach.

The revolution of Plovdiv (18 September 1885), which brought about the union of Eastern Rumelia with Bulgaria, took place with Alexander's consent, and he at once assumed the government of the province. In the year which followed, the prince gave evidence of considerable military and diplomatic ability. He rallied the Bulgarian army, now deprived of its Russian officers withdrawn by Tsar Alexander III which Alexander replaced by graduates of the Bulgarian Military Academy to resist the Serbian invasion (later on called "The Victory of Bulgarian Cadets vs. Serbian Generals"). The Bulgarians won a decisive victory at Slivnitsa (19 November), which Alexander had little to do with, having arrived in after the battle was already over. He pursued King Milan of Serbia into Serbian territory as far as Pirot, which he captured (27 November). Although the intervention of Austria protected Serbia from the consequences of defeat, Prince Alexander's success sealed the union with Eastern Rumelia, and after long negotiations the sultan Abdul Hamid II nominated the Prince of Bulgaria as governor-general of that province for five years (5 April 1886).

Loss of throne
This arrangement, however, cost Alexander much of his popularity in Bulgaria, while discontent prevailed among a number of his officers, who considered themselves slighted in the distribution of rewards at the close of the campaign. Encouraged by the promise of Tsar Alexander III to keep their Bulgarian rank in the Russian army and receiving common Russian salary these officers formed a military plot, and on the night of 20 August 1886 the conspirators seized the prince in the palace at Sofia and compelled him to sign his abdication; they then hurried him to the Danube at Oryahovo, transported him on his yacht to Reni, and handed him over to the Russian authorities, who allowed him to proceed to Lemberg. However, he soon returned to Bulgaria as a result of the success of the counter-revolution led by Stefan Stambolov, which overthrew the provisional government set up by the Russian party at Sofia. His position, however, had become untenable, partly as a result of an ill-considered telegram which he addressed to Tsar Alexander III on his return. The attitude of Bismarck, who, in conjunction with the Russian and Austrian governments, forbade him to punish the leaders of the military conspiracy, also undermined Alexander's position. He therefore issued a manifesto resigning the throne, and left Bulgaria on 8 September 1886.

After his abdication from the Bulgarian throne, Alexander I claimed the title Prince of Tarnovo and used it until his death.

Last years

Alexander then retired into private life. A few years later he married Johanna Loisinger, an actress, and assumed the style of Count von Hartenau (6 February 1889). They had a son Assen Ludwig Alexander, Count von Hartenau (1890-1965) and a daughter Countess Marie Therese Vera Tsvetana von Hartenau (1893-1935). The last years of his life he spent principally at Graz, where he held a local command in the Austrian army, and where he died of a ruptured appendix on 17 November 1893. His remains, brought to Sofia, received a public funeral there, and were buried in a mausoleum erected to his memory.

Prince Alexander possessed much charm and amiability of manner; he was tall, dignified and strikingly handsome. Many authorities have generally recognised his capabilities as a soldier. As a ruler he committed some errors, but his youth and inexperience and the extreme difficulty of his position account for much. He had some aptitude for diplomacy, and his intuitive insight and perception of character sometimes enabled him to outwit the crafty politicians who surrounded him. His principal fault remained a want of tenacity and resolution; his tendency to unguarded language undoubtedly increased the number of his enemies.

Honours
Battenberg Hill on Livingston Island in the South Shetland Islands, Antarctica is named after Prince Alexander Battenberg of Bulgaria.
 Founder and Grand Master of the Order of Bravery, 1 January 1880
 Founder and Grand Master of the Order of St. Alexander, 25 December 1881; Grand Cross with Collar
 Founder of the Order of the Bulgarian Red Cross, April 1886
 Grand Cross of the Military Merit Order

Foreign honours

Ancestry

See also
 History of Bulgaria
 Battenberg Mausoleum
 Prince Alexander of Battenberg Square

References

Further reading
 
 Bourchier, James D. "Prince Alexander of Battenberg," Fortnightly Review 55.325 (1894): 103-118. online
 
 
 Koch, Adolf. Prince Alexander of Battenberg: Reminiscences of His Reign in Bulgaria, from Authentic Sources (London, Whittaker & Company, 1887) online.
 
 Yordan Benedikov, "A History of Volunteers in the Serbo-Bulgarian War of 1885", published by the volunteer organization Slivnitsa, 1935 p. 83; new edition publishing house Издателство на Отечествения фронт, 1985 p. 113-14; Йордан Венедиков, История на доброволците от Сръбско-българската война - 1885 г., Издава Доброволческата Организация "Сливница", 1935 стр. 83; ново издание на Издателство на Отечествения фронт, 1985 г. стр. 113-14.

External links

 
 Historical photographs of the royal palace in Sofia

|-

1857 births
1893 deaths
People from Verona
19th-century Bulgarian monarchs
Governors-general
Governors-General of Eastern Rumelia
People of the Serbo-Bulgarian War
Battenberg family
Monarchs who abdicated
Burials at the Battenberg Mausoleum
Recipients of the Order of Bravery
Grand Crosses of the Order of Military Merit (Bulgaria)
Recipients of the Military Merit Cross (Mecklenburg-Schwerin)
Grand Croix of the Légion d'honneur
Recipients of the Order of the Medjidie, 1st class
Knights Grand Cross of the Order of Saints Maurice and Lazarus
Grand Crosses of the Order of the Star of Romania
Grand Crosses of the Order of the Crown (Romania)
Recipients of the Order of the White Eagle (Russia)
Recipients of the Order of St. Anna, 1st class
Recipients of the Order of St. Vladimir, 1st class
Recipients of the Order of St. George of the Fourth Degree
Recipients of the Order of the Cross of Takovo
Honorary Knights Grand Cross of the Order of the Bath